In air traffic control, an area control center (ACC), also known as a center or en-route center, is a facility responsible for controlling aircraft flying in the airspace of a given flight information region (FIR) at high altitudes between airport approaches and departures. In the US, such a center is referred to as an air route traffic control center (ARTCC).

A center typically accepts traffic from — and ultimately passes traffic to — the control of a terminal control center or another center.  Most centers are operated by the national governments of the countries in which they are located. The general operations of centers worldwide, and the boundaries of the airspace each center controls, are governed by the International Civil Aviation Organization (ICAO).

In some cases, the function of an area control center and a terminal control center are combined in a single facility.  For example, NATS combines the London Terminal Control Centre (LTCC) and London Area Control Centre (LACC) in Swanwick, Hampshire.

FAA definition

The United States Federal Aviation Administration (FAA) defines an ARTCC as: 

An ARTCC is the U.S. equivalent of an area control center (ACC).  There are 22 ARTCCs located in nineteen states.

Subdivision of airspace into sectors
The flight information region controlled by a center may be further administratively subdivided into areas comprising two to nine sectors.  Each area is staffed by a set of controllers trained on all the sectors in that area.

Sectors use distinct radio frequencies for communication with aircraft.  Each sector also has secure landline communications with adjacent sectors, approach controls, areas, ARTCCs, flight service centers, and military aviation control facilities.  These landline communications are shared among all sectors that need them and are available on a first-come, first-served basis.  Aircraft passing from one sector to another are handed off and requested to change frequencies to contact the next sector controller.  Sector boundaries are specified by an aeronautical chart.

Center operations

Air traffic controllers working within a center communicate via radio with pilots of instrument flight rules aircraft passing through the center's airspace.  A center's communication frequencies (typically in the very high frequency aviation bands, using amplitude modulation (AM) 118 MHz to 137 MHz, for overland control) are published in aeronautical charts and manuals, and are also announced to a pilot by the previous controller during a hand-off. Most VHF radio assignments also have a UHF (225 to 380 MHz) paired frequency used for military flights.

In addition to radios to communicate with aircraft, center controllers have access to communication links with other centers and TRACONs.  In the United States, centers are electronically linked through the National Airspace System, which allows nationwide coordination of traffic flow to manage congestion.  Centers in the United States also have electronic access to nationwide radar data.

Controllers use radar to monitor the progress of flights and instruct aircraft to perform course adjustments as needed to maintain separation from other aircraft.  Aircraft with center contact can be readily distinguished by their transponders.  Pilots may request altitude adjustments or course changes for reasons including avoidance of turbulence or adverse weather conditions.

Controllers can assign routing relative to location fixes derived from latitude and longitude, or from radionavigation beacons such as VORs.

Typically, centers have advance notice of a plane's arrival and intentions from its pre-filed flight plan.

Oceanic air traffic control

Some centers have ICAO-designated responsibility for airspace located over an ocean such as ZNY and ZOA, the majority of which is international airspace.  Because substantial volumes of oceanic airspace lie beyond the range of ground-based radars, oceanic airspace controllers have to estimate the position of an airplane from pilot reports and computer models (procedural control), rather than observing the position directly (radar control, also known as positive control).  Pilots flying over an ocean can determine their own positions accurately using the Global Positioning System and can supply periodic updates to a center.

A center's control service for an oceanic flight information region may be operationally distinct from its service for one over land, employing different communications frequencies, controllers, and a different ICAO code.

Pilots typically use high frequency radio instead of very high frequency radio to communicate with a center when flying over the ocean, because of HF's relatively greater propagation over long distances. Military aircraft, however, are typically installed with ARC-231 SATCOMs that allow over-the-horizon communication.

List of area control centers

Area control centers (ACCs) control IFR air traffic in their flight information region (FIR).

The current list of FIRs and ACCs is maintained by the International Civil Aviation Organization (ICAO). Note that the cited ICAO source gives the shapefile coordinates for each FIR, and also its page source gives a list of current ACCs in text form. The following is the alphabetic list of all ACCs and their FIRs :

See also
 Air corridor
 Air defense identification zone
 Airspace
 Air traffic control
 Airway (aviation)
 Control area (aviation)
 Control zone
 National Track Analysis Program
 Terminal control area

References

Air traffic control